Jairo Pinheiro Palmeira Neto (born 4 March 1994), simply known as Jairo Neto, is a Brazilian footballer who plays as a forward.

Despite having no links with East Timor, he had been naturalised and played for the country's national team between 2015. On 19 January 2017, the Asian Football Confederation declared Jairo Neto and eleven other Brazilian footballers ineligible to represent East Timor. Two months later, the East Timorese passport he had received have been declared ‘null and void’ by the Ministry of Justice of East Timor.

Career
Neto made his debut for Timor Leste in the first round of 2018 World Cup Qualifying against Mongolia, and scored on debut in their 4–1 victory.

International Goals
Correct as of 3 June 2015

under-23

Senior
Scores and results list East Timor's goal tally first.

References

1994 births
Living people
People from Camaçari
Brazilian footballers
Association football midfielders
Brazilian expatriate footballers
ŠK Slovan Bratislava players
C.F. União de Coimbra players
Taliya SC players
Associação Desportiva Cabofriense players
Associação Atlética Aparecidense players
Expatriate footballers in Portugal
Brazilian expatriate sportspeople in Portugal
Expatriate footballers in Slovakia
Brazilian expatriate sportspeople in Slovakia
Expatriate footballers in Syria
Brazilian expatriate sportspeople in Syria
Syrian Premier League players

East Timorese footballers
Timor-Leste international footballers
Sportspeople from Bahia